Neapolis was a town in ancient Pisidia, a few miles south of Antioch. Pliny mentions it as a town of the Roman province of Galatia, which embraced a portion of Pisidia. It became a bishopric; no longer the seat of a residential bishop, it remains, under the name of Neapolis in Pisidia, a titular see of the Roman Catholic Church.

Its site is located near the modern Kıyakdede, Asiatic Turkey.

References

Populated places in Pisidia
Roman towns and cities in Turkey
Former populated places in Turkey
Populated places of the Byzantine Empire
Catholic titular sees in Asia
History of Isparta Province
Şarkikaraağaç District